Conus suduirauti is a species of sea snail, a marine gastropod mollusk in the family Conidae, the cone snails and their allies.

Like all species within the genus Conus, these snails are predatory and venomous. They are capable of "stinging" humans, therefore live ones should be handled carefully or not at all.

Description
The size of the shell varies between 16 mm and 24 mm.

Distribution
Conus suduirauti is a marine species native to the Philippines.

References

 Raybaudi Massilia G. (2004) An "old" new species of Conus from the Philippines. Visaya 1(2): 38–41.
 Puillandre N., Duda T.F., Meyer C., Olivera B.M. & Bouchet P. (2015). One, four or 100 genera? A new classification of the cone snails. Journal of Molluscan Studies. 81: 1–23

External links
 The Conus Biodiversity website
 Cone Shells – Knights of the Sea
 

suduirauti
Gastropods described in 2004